The Pedagogical University of Cracow (UP), is named after the Commission of National Education created by King Stanisław August Poniatowski. It is a public university located in Kraków, Poland. It was founded soon after the conclusion of World War II, on May 11, 1946, originally as the National Higher College of Teacher Training. Its aim is the training of highly qualified teaching staff for the Polish educational system.

The Pedagogical University is the earliest pedagogical university in postwar Poland. It functions according to the model of integrated education combining theoretical knowledge with practical skills. The mission of the university is reinforced in scientific research and development according to the highest European standards in several dozen fields of studies. It runs first-cycle (bachelor's) and second-cycle (master's) degree programmes, as well as in the third-cycle degree studies (Ph.D.), and post-graduate study courses.

History
At the beginning, the Pedagogical Academy trained elementary school teachers; with the curriculum spanning over a period of 3 years. As early as in 1949, it began training secondary school teachers and was split into a new organizational structure based on departments. The academic posts were appointed, including those of the Senate, the Department Councils, the Rector, Vice-Rectors and the deans.

In 1954 the college received the title of a Higher College. Curriculum increased to 4 years and students graduated with a Master's degree. The Polish October political transformations of 1956 resulted in the college gaining significant autonomy. For the first time the Rector was elected and not nominated. The first elected Rector was Prof. dr Wincenty Danek. Under his administration, the Higher College of Teacher Training rapidly developed and earned even more reputation. From the academic year 1958/1959 studies were extended to five years.

In 1959 the university received the right to offer doctorate degree programs and in 1967 the right to confer the degree of habilitated doctor.

In 1989 a period of political and social transformations resulted in the academy receiving complete independence and self-government. On October 1, 1999, the college was renamed to the Pedagogical Academy of Cracow of the National Education Commission (Akademia Pedagogiczna im. Komisji Edukacji Narodowej w Krakowie). On October 3, 2008, the college was renamed to the Pedagogical University of Cracow of the National Education Commission (Uniwersytet Pedagogiczny im. Komisji Edukacji Narodowej w Krakowie).

Organizational structure

Faculties

Faculty of Humanities

Faculty of Exact and Natural Sciences

Faculty of  Social Sciences

Faculty of Education and Psychology

Faculty of Art

Instituties 

 Institute of Security and Computer Science
 Institute of Biology and Earth Sciences
 Institute of Journalism and International Relations
 Institute of English Philology
 Institute of Polish Philology
 Institute of Philosophy and Sociology
 Institute  of History and Archival Studies
 Institute of Painting and Artistic Education
 Institute of Mathematics
 Institute of Information Studies
 Institute of Technical Sciences
 Institute of Modern Languages
 Institute of Pre-School and School Education
 Institute of Special School Education and Teacher Training

 Institute of Social Pedagogy and Family Support
 Institute of  Law, Administration and Economics
 Institute of Psychology
 Institute of Social Affairs and Public Health
 Institute of  Art and Design

References

Links
Pedagogical University. General information. Homepage.

Universities and colleges in Kraków
Teachers colleges in Poland
Educational institutions established in 1946
1946 establishments in Poland